The 1979 IPSC Handgun World Shoot IV held in Johannesburg, South Africa was the fourth IPSC Handgun World Shoot, and was won by Jimmy Von Sorgenfrei, one of the top seeds before the championship. Leading up to the championship, the South African team had many good competitors, making the team selection tough. Seemingly out of nowhere Jimmy Von Sorgenfrei had appeared on the competition circuit, improving his performances consistently throughout the year before the championship, and was selected for the South African National Team of five men.

Champions
Individual

Teams

See also 
IPSC Rifle World Shoots
IPSC Shotgun World Shoot
IPSC Action Air World Shoot

References
American Handgunner March/April 1980 - page 10 of 80

1979
1979 in shooting sports
Shooting competitions in South Africa
1979 in South African sport
International sports competitions hosted by South Africa